Edmond Loichot (1905–1989)  was a Swiss footballer who played for Switzerland in the 1934. He also played for Urania Genève Sport and Servette FC.

References

Swiss men's footballers
Switzerland international footballers
1934 FIFA World Cup players
Association football midfielders
Servette FC players
1905 births
1989 deaths